is a junction railway station in the city of Daisen, Akita Prefecture, Japan, operated by East Japan Railway Company (JR East).

Lines
Ōmagari Station is served by the Ōu Main Line, Tazawako Line and Akita Shinkansen. It is located 240.7 km from the terminus of the Ōu Main Line at Fukushima Station and is 75.6 kilometers from the intermediate terminus of the Akita Shinkansen at Morioka Station. The station is also a terminal station for the Tazawako Line, and is 76.6 kilometers from the opposing terminal at Morioka Station.

Station layout
Ōmagari Station has a side platform, island platform and bay platform serving a total of five tracks. Platforms 1 and 2 are for the Ōu Main Line, while trains using platforms 3, 11, and 12 reverse into and out of the station. The platforms are connected by a footbridge and the station has a Midori no Madoguchi staffed ticket office.

Platforms

History
Ōmagari Station was opened on December 21, 1904 on the Japanese Government Railways (JGR) Ōu Main Line, serving the town of Ōmagari, Akita. The predecessor of the Tozawako Line, the Obonai keiben-sen, began operations from July 30, 1921, and was nationalized the following year. The JGR became the Japan National Railways (JNR) after World War II. The station was absorbed into the JR East network upon the privatization of the JNR on April 1, 1987. The Akita Shinkansen began operations from March 22, 1997 and a new station building was inaugurated on July 20 of the same year.

Passenger statistics
In fiscal 2018, the station was used by an average of 2043 passengers daily (boarding passengers only).

Surrounding area
 Ōmagari post office

References

External links

 JR East Station information 

Railway stations in Japan opened in 1904
Railway stations in Akita Prefecture
Akita Shinkansen
Ōu Main Line
Tazawako Line
Daisen, Akita